Monroe Township is one of twelve townships in Pulaski County, Indiana, United States. As of the 2010 census, its population was 4,019 and it contained 1,848 housing units.

History
The Pulaski County Home was listed on the National Register of Historic Places in 2015.

Geography

Cities, towns, villages
 Winamac

Adjacent townships
 Franklin Township (north)
 Tippecanoe Township (northeast)
 Harrison Township (east)
 Van Buren Township (southeast)
 Indian Creek Township (south)
 Beaver Township (southwest)
 Jefferson Township (west)
 Rich Grove Township (northwest)

Cemeteries
The township contains these four cemeteries: Crown Hill, Memorial Gardens, Reed and Saint Peters.

Major highways
  U.S. Route 35
  Indiana State Road 14
  Indiana State Road 119

Rivers
 Tippecanoe River

Education
 Eastern Pulaski Community School Corporation

Monroe Township residents may obtain a free library card from the Pulaski County Public Library in Winamac.

Political districts
 Indiana's 2nd congressional district
 State House District 20
 State Senate District 18

References
 United States Census Bureau 2008 TIGER/Line Shapefiles
 United States Board on Geographic Names (GNIS)
 IndianaMap

External links
 Indiana Township Association
 United Township Association of Indiana

Townships in Pulaski County, Indiana
Townships in Indiana